Jim Rutherford (1913–1964) was an Australian rugby league footballer who played in the 1930s and 1940s.

Playing career
Originally from Murwillumbah, New South Wales, Rutherford played five seasons with St. George between 1931-1937. 

Rutherford played second row in the 1933 Grand Final. Rutherford captained Saints on their New Zealand tour at the end of the 1933 season. He also represented New South Wales on four occasions in 1933, and played from New South Wales City Firsts in 1934. 

Rutherford enlisted in the AIF in 1940 and during a stay in Sydney, he turned out for Western Suburbs for one year in 1941.

Death
Rutherford died on 16 June 1964.

References

1913 births
1964 deaths
Australian rugby league players
St. George Dragons players
Western Suburbs Magpies players
New South Wales rugby league team players
City New South Wales rugby league team players
Australian military personnel of World War II
Rugby league players from Murwillumbah
Rugby league second-rows